The Salisbury Mall was a one-level  regional mall located on Civic and Glen Avenues in Salisbury, Maryland. The Salisbury Mall was the first enclosed climate-controlled shopping mall on the Delmarva Peninsula. In the October 16, 1968, edition of the Daily Times in Salisbury, it was reported that the overall cost of the mall had exceeded $7 million, and the parking lot could accommodate 3,300 vehicles. The mall was anchored by Sears, Hecht's, Peebles, and Food Depot.

Location
The mall's location near Salisbury's downtown district, and the fact that there was no other regional mall within a sixty-mile radius, allowed the Salisbury Mall to thrive as the only regional shopping mall on the Eastern Shore of Maryland for two decades. The Salisbury Mall's regional mall competition was the Blue Hen Mall (now the Blue Hen Corporate Center) in Dover, Delaware (60 miles away), which opened in 1969, and the Dover Mall, which opened in 1982. Salisbury Mall's location on Civic and Glen Avenues was situated between a residential neighborhood and businesses along U.S. Route 50. The Wicomico Youth and Civic Center was within  of the mall, and a city park and zoo were within walking distance. A shopping center called Twilley Shopping Centre, which included a Toys "R" Us, was soon built directly behind the mall's west wing to take advantage of the traffic from the mall. Service Merchandise also built a store within two blocks of the mall. The Salisbury Mall enjoyed a strong tourist customer base given its location on the major roadways of the Eastern Shore of Maryland and its close proximity to the popular tourist resort, Ocean City.

History

1960s
The official grand opening took place on October 16, 1968. At the time of the grand opening only sixteen of the forty stores were open for business, but by the holiday shopping season all of the stores were ready.

The front page of the Daily Times read, "Miss America will be on hand for opening of $7,000,000 mall here." The article states, "Opening ceremonies and speeches are expected to be brief, according to Will Hall, mall manager ... Before the day is over, hundreds—and perhaps thousands—of shoppers or sight-seers are expected to stroll the interior mall with its illuminated fountains and planters and new shops."

The Daily Times speculated that when fully functional, the Salisbury Mall would employ at least 1,000 workers with a payroll around $6 million per month.

The Salisbury Mall was originally anchored by Sears, and Hecht's (then known as The Hecht Co). The mall's west wing spanned 1/10 of a mile.

Renovation and expansion
The mall underwent a major renovation and expansion in 1976. An east wing was added, which opened on September 12, 1976. The mall's west section had a classic look with pillared entrances, whereas the east section was more modern. The entire building was made of white brick and stone. The mall's interior flooring space was re-done with a simulated wood parque during the renovation, replacing the original white ceramic tiles. The parking lot was expanded to accommodate parking for up to 5,000 vehicles. This expansion nearly doubled the mall's size, which added two additional anchors: Shoppers Food Warehouse (Originally Pantry Pride) and regional department store Hutzler's. (later Peebles). Also added were a two-screen movie theater, a Friendly's restaurant, and space for 30 additional stores. This brought the total number of shops and restaurants to 70 and made the mall in the shape of an H.

The Salisbury Mall continued to flourish well into the 1980s, though the owners did little to renovate the interior structure, with the exception of the Tier 1 and 2 level stores, which received some minor renovations to keep up with the rapidly changing styles of the 1980s. On April 30, 1987, Hutzler's closed its doors after being purchased by another regional department store: Peebles. The anchor site was completely renovated and re-opened on August 1, 1987. This would be the last major addition to the mall. On May 31, 1989, Shoppers Food Warehouse closed its Salisbury location, and in its place a similar grocery store called Food Depot opened on September 1, 1989, after some minor renovations.

Decline 1990-1999

The demise of the Salisbury Mall came about when it became obvious that a US 50 extension of the Salisbury Bypass was necessary to relieve the annual downtown congestion.

On July 27, 1990, The Centre at Salisbury, a  super regional mall located just three miles (5 km) north of the Salisbury Mall, opened, which signaled the beginning of the end for the aging mall. 

The Centre at Salisbury attracted more upscale establishments lacking at the Salisbury Mall, including amenities that were standard at most regional shopping malls, such as a food court, and a modern multi-plex theater. 

Previously, locals would have to travel to the Baltimore/Washington, D.C. metropolitan area, or to outlet centers in nearby Delaware, for these amenities.

Hecht's and Sears relocated to the newly built mall in November 1991 as their leases expired, leaving Peebles and Food Depot as the only remaining anchors. In 1992, some of the remaining merchants undertook minor renovations to give their stores a more modern look, but the mall owners did no renovations on the mall itself, which retained from the 1970s its use of earth tones, low ceilings, and unremarkable architecture. The original Salisbury Mall marquee sign from 1968 still stood in the parking lot, slowly rusting by this point. This contrasted with other malls in the region, including the newly built Centre at Salisbury, with its heavy use of skylights, high ceilings, marble flooring, large atria, and use of pastel colors popular in mall design in the 1990s.

In March 1992, the two-screen movie theater closed for business. Foot traffic decreased due to the loss of two of the four anchor stores and more than two-thirds of the Tier 1 and 2 level stores, and due to rising crime rates in the surrounding area. Both of the mall's sit-down restaurants, Friendly's and Tony's Pizza, closed in May 1992. This was the final blow to the aging mall. Most of the remaining tenants would follow suit throughout the remainder of the decade as their leases expired, with the exception of the smallest shops.

Homicide 
On September 9, 1991, a seventeen-year-old Salisbury State University freshman student from Pittsburgh, Pennsylvania was murdered when she separated from a group of friends to use the restroom. When she exited the stall inside the ladies room she was confronted by David Boyd. He immediately stabbed her once in her chest and then spun her around and stabbed her once more in the back. Boyd then ran out of the restroom while Miller cried in pain. He then rode his bike to a nearby park where he fell asleep. He was arrested and convicted of murder, and sentenced to life in prison. Boyd continues to serve his sentence at the Maryland Correctional Institution - Hagerstown, located exactly halfway in between Miller's hometown of Pittsburgh and Salisbury, Maryland.

West wing closure
The mall changed owners in 1997, purchased by Salisbury Mall Associates, LLC of Baltimore, Maryland. The new owners closed the original west wing of the mall in the spring of 1998 by erecting a plywood divider to block it off from the eastern wing. The western wing was allowed to quickly deteriorate. Because of the mall's flat roof, leaks were often a problem, and the original west wing was now going without the most basic of upkeep and maintenance.

There had been several unsuccessful attempts to attract the required national anchor chains to breathe life back into the deteriorating structure. Peebles, Food Depot, and a few antique kiosks were all that were left by the end of 1999. Most of the remaining tenants either relocated to nearby strip malls, or simply went out of business. The nearby residents of the mall started complaining to the city of Salisbury because the structure was literally falling apart. Weeds had started to grow in the parking lot.

Final years 2000-2004

The last remaining department store, Peebles, closed its doors on November 21, 2001, leaving only Food Depot, The Connection, Illusion's Games and Comics, a branch of Sojourner-Douglass College, a martial arts academy, and a handful of small businesses. 

The last remaining anchor—Food Depot—closed on November 19, 2003, leaving only a few small shops and the martial arts academy.

The final tenant, The Connection, a locally owned clothing store, left the mall on November 23, 2004, relocating to The Twilley Center located directly behind the mall. 

The mall deteriorated rapidly; the original west wing caught fire due to an electrical short, and the City of Salisbury condemned the building on July 5, 2005.

Demolition and redevelopment plans
Demolition began on August 8, 2007, and was completed on November 21 of the same year. Cleanup occurred from December 2007 to April 2008: the remaining 40,000 tons of debris, consisting of the steel frame and masonry, was shipped to nearby recyclers. Some masonry remains on site for future use in road beds.

Debate is ongoing between the property owners of the property and the local community as to how the property should be used. The original redevelopment plan called for the land to be redeveloped as a mixed-use 685-unit residential/retail complex with a man-made lake, which would be known as The Village at Salisbury Lake. Construction was scheduled to begin in June 2008; however, these plans were put on hold due to the housing slump, and later the Great Recession that followed.

On November 12, 2007, the main building contractor, K. Hovnanian Homes of Maryland, LLC, filed suit against the property owner, Salisbury Mall Associates, LLC. The plaintiff was granted permission, by Wicomico County Circuit Court judge Donald C. Davis, to cancel their contract and pull out of the Village at Salisbury Lake development on September 29, 2008. On April 13, 2009, a stay of enforcement was granted to the defendant pending outcome of an appeal to the Maryland Court of Appeals. The defendant was required to post a $24,000 bond based on an estimated 18-month appeal period.  The appeal was scheduled to be heard on February 3, 2010, as case number 2681/08.  On July 6, 2011 the Court of Special Appeals vacated the judgement from the Wicomico County Circuit Court.  The case was dismissed with prejudice.

Since April 2008, the mall site has remained empty except for piles of masonry reserved for future use.

On July 10, 2019, the mall site was sold to Crossroads Salisbury, LLC for a residential and commercial development.

References

Further reading

External links
Salisbury Mall article at Malls of America
Salisbury Mall article at Labelscar
The Salisbury Mall Archive at Blogger
The Village at Salisbury Lake

Shopping malls in Maryland
Buildings and structures in Salisbury, Maryland
Shopping malls established in 1968
Shopping malls disestablished in 2004
Demolished shopping malls in the United States
1968 establishments in Maryland
2004 disestablishments in Maryland
Buildings and structures demolished in 2007
Demolished buildings and structures in Maryland